Hernandes is a Portuguese patronymic surname, a variant of the Spanish surname Hernández.

 Clodovil Hernandes (1937-2009), Brazilian fashion stylist, television presenter, and politician
 Daniel Hernandes (born 1979), Brazilian judoka
 Sônia Hernandes (born 1958), Brazilian pastor

See also
 Fernandes
 Fernández
 Hernández

Portuguese-language surnames
Patronymic surnames
Surnames from given names